

Regular verbs

-ar verbs (cantar, 'to sing')

-er and -re verbs (batre, 'to beat')

-ir verbs (sentir, 'to feel')

Auxiliary verbs

ésser/ser ('to be')

estar ('to be') 

Catalan language
Indo-European verbs